Charles Belcher (15 December 1872 – 1 April 1938) was an English cricketer. He played for Gloucestershire between 1890 and 1892.

References

1872 births
1938 deaths
English cricketers
Gloucestershire cricketers
People from Berkeley, Gloucestershire
Sportspeople from Gloucestershire